Colors: Bangin' in South Carolina is a 2014 documentary film directed by Terry Davis. The documentary explores the gang epidemic that plagued the state's capital city, Columbia for years. The film details the 15-year gang feud between the Crips, Bloods, and Gangster Disciples. In 2014, the documentary was presented with the Film Heals award at the Manhattan Film Festival at the Quad City Cinema in New York City.

References

External links
 

2014 films
American documentary films
Documentary films about gangs in the United States
2014 documentary films
Documentary films about South Carolina
Columbia, South Carolina
2010s English-language films
2010s American films